Taabinga may refer to:

 Taabinga, Queensland, a town in the South Burnett Region, Australia
 Taabinga Homestead, a heritage-listed homestead in Haly Creek, South Burnett Region, Australia